Abdulaziz Saud Albabtain (born in Kuwait in 1936) is a Kuwaiti poet and businessman. He is currently the Head of the Albabtain Foundation for Poetic Creativity.

Current efforts 
He has established the Albabtain Central Library for Arabic poetry,.

In 2004 he established the Albabtain Translation Center to support translations into and from Arabic.

The Al-Babtain Foundation for Poetic Creativity called in January 2016 for contributions to an Arabic epic on themes of peace, tolerance and love.

Since 2016, Al-Babtain has also endowed the Abdulaziz Saud AlBabtain Laudian Professorship in Arabic in the Faculty of Oriental Studies at the University of Oxford. Formerly known as the Laudian Chair in Arabic, it was first endowed in 1636 by Archbishop William Laud and is one of the oldest Chairs of Arabic in Europe.

References 

1936 births
Living people
20th-century Kuwaiti poets
21st-century Kuwaiti poets